The Polignac Memorandum was a document by George Canning (British Foreign Secretary) written in October 1823, stating that Great Britain had no intention of aiding Spain in the retention of her colonies in Latin and South America.  The document was a result of talks with Prince Jules de Polignac, the French Ambassador to Great Britain.  Both countries (France and Great Britain) agreed that there was no hope of Spain recovering her colonies in the Americas, that neither nation had any desire to gain territory in the region, or gain exclusive commercial treaties.  Canning was then able to advise King George IV to extend diplomatic recognition to Buenos Aires, Colombia, and Mexico, and authorize British ministers in South America to negotiate with their respective states for commercial treaties.

During this time period, the European states had formed the Quintuple Alliance after the 1815 Congress of Vienna to restore balance to Europe after the Napoleonic Wars.  Spain was  having trouble with its colonies in Latin and South America, and was fighting a losing battle to remain an empire.  Villele, the French Prime Minister under Louis XVIII viewed the Polignac Memorandum as a way to refuse to aid Ferdinand VII in his attempts to regain his colonies.

References
Leslie Bethell, The Independence of Latin America, Cambridge University Press (1987), 212.
Majorie Bloy, A Web of English History: The Age of George III. 
William Kaufmann, British Policy and the Independence of Latin America, Routledge, (1968), 157

Memoranda
Foreign relations of the United Kingdom
1823 in international relations
1823 in the United Kingdom
1823 in South America
1823 documents
October 1823 events